In organic chemistry, brosyl (or para-bromophenylsulfonyl) group is a functional group with the chemical formula BrC6H4SO2. This group is usually introduced using the compound brosyl chloride, BrC6H4SO2Cl, which forms sulfonyl esters and amides of p-bromophenylsulfonic acid. The term brosylate refers to the anion of p-bromophenylsulfonic acid (BrC6H4SO3−).

See also
 Tosyl group
 Tosylic acid
 Triflic acid
 Sulfonyl group

Sulfonyl groups
Functional groups

References